Il grido (initially titled The Cry–Il Grido in the UK and The Outcry in the US) is a 1957 Italian drama film directed by Michelangelo Antonioni and starring Steve Cochran, Alida Valli, and Betsy Blair. It received the Golden Leopard at the 1957 Locarno Film Festival.

Plot

Aldo works as a mechanic in a sugar refinery in Goriano in Northern Italy. Irma, his mistress for seven years, learns that her husband, who left for Australia years ago in search of a job, recently died there. Irma goes to the refinery and drops off Aldo's lunch, but does not stay to talk with him. Concerned about her behaviour, Aldo goes back to the house where they discuss her husband's death. Aldo suggests that after seven years they can finally get married and legitimise their daughter Rosina. The next day, Irma reveals that she has fallen in love with someone else a few months ago. Aldo is devastated and desperately tries to change her mind during the following days, but to no avail. When he slaps Irma in public, she declares this incident the end of their relationship.

Distraught and disillusioned, Aldo leaves Goriano with Rosina, and the two start wandering throughout the Po Valley. They stop at the house of his former girlfriend Elvia, who works as a seamstress. He flatters her and helps repair a racing boat owned by the boyfriend of Elvia's younger sister Edera. Later he and Rosina join Elvia and Edera watching the river race, with Elvia holding Aldo's arm, but Aldo cannot hide his sadness for long and retracts. In his absence, Irma shows up at Elvia's house to deliver Aldo's valise and gives her the news of their separation. Elvia has little sympathy for Irma, believing she will regret throwing away her relationship with Aldo. That night Elvia and Aldo go to a dance, but Elvia asks to leave early so she can talk with him. Upset that Aldo returned to her only after Irma broke off their relationship, she asks him to move on. She also tells him she received his valise from Irma, but does not mention Irma's visit. Later that evening, Edera returns from the dance a little drunk and flirtatious, and she and Aldo kiss, but Aldo can only think of Irma. He leaves with his daughter early the next morning. Elvia tells her sister that she is sad about his departure, but remains calm on the outside.

Aldo and Rosina continue their travels. He is unsuccessful in finding a steady job, as there is no worksite with a school for Rosina nearby. The relationship between the two becomes strained, and when Rosina is almost hit by a car, he slaps her. They get a ride atop a petrol truck, but are forced to disembark before a police check point near a filling station, as passengers on the vehicle are not allowed. The driver tells Aldo that he will pick him up the following day when the police are not around. The filling station is run by Virginia, a young widow who lives with her father, a former farmer whose land she sold. She offers Aldo and Rosina the shack next to the station for the night. The next morning, Virginia offers Aldo a job. When the truck driver from the previous day approaches and asks if Aldo still wants the ride, he declines, choosing to stay. Soon, he and Virginia become lovers.

Rosina spends time with Virginia's father, singing old Anarchist anthems with him or throwing stones at the workers on the land which he previously owned. Enervated by her father's erratic behaviour, Virginia decides to put him in a retirement home. On the way back, Aldo and Virginia get into repeated quarrels, first because Virginia didn't have an eye on Rosina who ran away, and later because Rosina discovers them making love in an open field. Virginia starts crying, while Aldo utters Irma's name. Back at the house, Virginia suggests that they can no longer take care of Rosina, and soon Aldo puts her on a bus back to her mother. As the bus pulls away, Aldo runs after her, shouting that he loves her.

Some time later, after leaving Virginia, Aldo finds work as a mechanic with a dredge crew. Listening to his boss' tales of travel, Aldo thinks about going to Venezuela and starts learning Spanish, but soon loses interest. He helps Andreina, a local prostitute living in a riverside shack, by forcing a doctor to examine her. When the police show up, Aldo, convinced that they are after him, rushes off, leaving behind his coat. Andreina finds the shack where Aldo is hiding, and they go for a walk, speaking about their past. Aldo recalls how he met Irma, and Andreina how she once almost got married but lost her unborn child.

During the following days the rain falls heavy over the Po valley, and the river rises. The roof of the shack which Andreina and Aldo have moved into leaks, and both she and Aldo are starving. Infuriated about Aldo's lethargy, she goes to a nearby restaurant where she intends to sleep with the owner for food. Aldo follows and tries to get her to come back, but, confronted with her ongoing accusations, eventually walks out in silence, leaving behind a grieving Andreina. 

Taking a ride on a truck back to Goriano, Aldo meets Virginia at the filling station again. She gives him the valise he left behind and tells him about a postcard that arrived from Irma, which she says she has misplaced. In his anger, Aldo grabs Virginia, but finally lets go of her.

Arriving in Goriano, Aldo finds the town in turmoil over the construction of an airfield, which the inhabitants, threatened with dispossession, protest against. He walks through the deserted streets and sees Rosina entering Irma's house. Through the window, he sees Irma comforting a new child of her own, and walks away. Irma notices him and follows him to the deserted sugar refinery, whose workers have joined the protesters. Exhausted, Aldo climbs to the top of the refinery tower where he once worked. From the ground Irma calls up to him, and he turns and sees her down below. Appearing weak and disoriented, Aldo falls to his death as Irma cries out in horror. She kneels over his dead body, while the townspeople, heading for a rally, pass by in the background.

Cast
 Steve Cochran as Aldo
 Alida Valli as Irma
 Betsy Blair as Elvia
 Gabriella Pallotta as Edera, Elvia's sister
 Dorian Gray as Virginia (dubbed by Monica Vitti)
 Lyn Shaw as Andreina
 Mirna Girardi as Rosina
 Pina Boldrini as Lina, Irma's sister
 Guerrino Campanilli as Virginia's father
 Pietro Corvelatti as Fisherman
 Lilia Landi as Woman
 Gaetano Matteucci as Edera's fiancé
 Elli Parvo as Donna Matilda

Production and release
Antonioni had written the script for Il grido in the late 1940s while working on another production in the Po area. The film was realised as an Italian–American co-production and shot in Winter 1956/1957 on location in the lower Po Valley, including Occhiobello, Pontelogoscuro, Ferrara, Stienta and Ca'Venier. Antonioni later spoke of problems he had with some of his foreign actors: with Betsy Blair, because she wanted the meaning behind her complete dialogue explained in detail, and with Steve Cochran for regularly refusing to follow the director's instructions.

Il grido premiered at the Locarno Film Festival on 14 July 1957 and in Rome on 29 November 1957. Of the films Antonioni had made up to this point, Il grido proved to be the least successful at the box office, earning a mere 25 million lire during its initial release.

In English speaking countries, the film saw a delayed release, in late 1961 in the UK and in October 1962 in the US. In the US, it was also shown in a dubbed and shortened version, released by Astor Pictures.

Reception
While Antonioni's previous film Le Amiche had been artistically acknowledged by Italian critics, the reactions towards Il grido were, depending on the source, unanimously negative or sympathetic only in a handful of cases, calling its director "cold" and "inhuman". (Contrary to this, Seymour Chatman in Michaelangelo Antonioni: The Investigation cites Il grido as his "first genuine critical success".) In a later interview, Antonioni explained that he had been in a state of depression at the time, and that the film reflected this in a more pessimistic, desperate tone. As a result of the film's disappointing domestic reception, Antonioni was forced to cancel planned film projects and turn to theatre work, before returning to the cinema with his 1960 L'Avventura.

On the occasion of the film's 1962 New York release (where it was screened in Italian with English subtitles), The New York Times critic A. H. Weiler saw an "interesting, sometimes arresting slice of life at the lower depths", but the outlook of its director as "dismal and depressed". F. Maurice Speed, writing for the British Film Review, was more enthusiastic, calling it "brilliant" and "sad, fascinating and finely directed".

Themes
In retrospect, critics such as Leslie Camhi (The Village Voice), Philip French (The Guardian) and Keith Phipps (The A.V. Club) saw Il grido as a transitional work between Antonioni's neorealist roots and his later films. In her 1984 analysis of Italian cinema, Mira Liehm writes that while Il grido contains neo-realist elements, "particularly the interdependence between the landscapes and the characters and the emphasis on objects", protagonist Aldo "foreshadows Sandro in L'avventura and Giovanni in La notte in his refusal to acknowledge the fading of love".

Reviewers disagree about whether Aldo's death at the end is intentional or not. While French critic Gérard Gozlan (Positif) saw it as a suicide, Seymour Chatman argues that Aldo is overcome with vertigo as he stands atop the tower, causing him to fall to his death. Chatman found support in the original screenplay, which mentions that Aldo attempts to resist a sudden onset of vertigo as he looks down on the ground. Peter Brunette regards the ending as being ambiguous: Aldo's death can be viewed either as caused by a fall or a deliberate jump.

Liehm, Brunette and Geoffrey Nowell-Smith also point out that as an exception in Antonioni's films, the protagonist of Il grido is a member of the working class instead of the bourgeoisie, an observation confirmed by the director in an interview in which he stated that only Il grido and his early documentary short Gente del Po (1947) were about working class concerns.

Awards
 1957 Locarno International Film Festival: Golden Leopard for Michelangelo Antonioni
 1958 Nastro d'Argento for Best Cinematography (Gianni di Venanzo)

In popular culture
In Alfred Andersch's 1960 novel Die Rote (The Redhead), protagonist Fabio reflects on Antonioni's film.

References

Bibliography

External links
 
 
 
 
 

1957 films
1957 drama films
Italian black-and-white films
Italian drama road movies
1950s Italian-language films
Films set in Italy
Films directed by Michelangelo Antonioni
Golden Leopard winners
Films scored by Giovanni Fusco
1950s Italian films